Awli (also known as Āblī, Ālbī, and Avli) is a village in Sina Rural District of the Central District of Varzaqan County, East Azerbaijan province, Iran. At the 2006 National Census, its population was 528 in 108 households. The following census in 2011 counted 475 people in 127 households. The latest census in 2016 showed a population of 495 people in 163 households; it was the largest village in its rural district.

References 

Varzaqan County

Populated places in East Azerbaijan Province

Populated places in Varzaqan County